Susan Jarratt is professor emerita of Comparative Literature at the University of California, Irvine. She earned her Ph.D. at the University of Texas at Austin. Her interests include ancient Greek and Roman rhetoric, feminist theory, historiography, and contemporary rhetoric and writing.

Jarratt is the current editor of Rhetoric Society Quarterly, the journal of the Rhetoric Society of America. She is a past president of the American Society for the History of Rhetoric.

Her publications include Rereading the Sophists: Classical Rhetoric Refigured (1991) and "Classics and Counterpublics in Nineteenth-Century Historically Black Colleges" (2009), which won the NCTE Richard C. Ohmann Award for Outstanding Article in College English. She also co-edited the book Feminism and Composition Studies: In Other Words (1998) with Lynn Worsham.

References

University of California, Irvine faculty
Living people
Year of birth missing (living people)